The Criminal (French: Le criminel) is a 1926 French silent drama film directed by Alexandre Ryder and starring Teresina Boronat, André Nox and Roger San Juana.

Cast
 Teresina Boronat as Mercédès 
 André Nox as Don Joaquim 
 Roger San Juana as Roselito 
 Madeleine Barjac as Isabelle 
 Jean Lorette as Pablo 
 Pâquerette as Sérafina

References

Bibliography
 Rège, Philippe. Encyclopedia of French Film Directors, Volume 1. Scarecrow Press, 2009.

External links

1926 films
1926 drama films
French drama films
French silent films
1920s French-language films
Films based on French novels
Films directed by Alexandre Ryder
French black-and-white films
Silent drama films
1920s French films